The Lamoni Community School District is a rural public school district headquartered in Lamoni, Iowa.

It covers sections of Decatur and Ringgold counties. The district serves the city of Lamoni, and surrounding rural areas.

The school's mascot is the Demons. Their colors are black and red.

Schools
The district operates three schools in a single facility at 202 N. Walnut Street in Lamoni.
Lamoni Elementary School
Lamoni Middle School
Lamoni High School

Lamoni High School

Athletics 
The Demons compete in the Bluegrass Conference, including the following sports:

Volleyball 
Football (8-man)
Basketball (boys and girls)
Bowling (boys and girls)
Track and Field (boys and girls)
 Boys' - 1952 State Champions
Golf (boys and girls)
Baseball 
Softball

The students from Lamoni also compete as part of teams from Central Decatur in the Pride of Iowa Conference:
Cross Country (boys and girls)
Wrestling

See also
List of school districts in Iowa
List of high schools in Iowa

References

External links
 Lamoni Community School District

School districts in Iowa
Education in Decatur County, Iowa
Education in Ringgold County, Iowa